William Frederick Hitchcock (born August 26, 1965) is a Canadian-born former professional American football player who played offensive lineman for four seasons for the Seattle Seahawks.

References

1965 births
Living people
American football offensive linemen
Canadian players of American football
Purdue Boilermakers football players
Seattle Seahawks players
Sportspeople from Kirkland Lake